The 374th Strategic Missile Squadron is an inactive United States Air Force unit.  It was last assigned to the 308th Strategic Missile Wing, stationed at Little Rock Air Force Base, Arkansas.

The squadron  was equipped with the LGM-25C Titan II Intercontinental ballistic missile (ICBM), with a mission of nuclear deterrence.  The squadron was inactivated as part of the phaseout of the Titan II ICBM on 15 August 1986.

The squadron was responsible for Launch Complex 374–7, site of the 1980 explosion of a Titan II ICBM in Damascus, Arkansas.

History

World War II 
The squadron was activated in early 1942 in Idaho as a long-range B-24 Liberator bombardment squadron as part of the Second Air Force. For three months little training occurred while the unit worked through its growing pains, resolving administrative and personnel acquisition difficulties. Then a totally new problem arose....all but four personnel were transferred to the 330th Bombardment Group. While active on paper, it was not until September that personnel were taken from the 39th Bombardment Group to form a headquarters cadre for the 308th Group, making it a viable unit. On 29 September, the squadron was designated an Operational Training Unit (OTU) with Wendover Field, Utah as its home station. The unit was fully manned by November, after receiving personnel from the 18th Replacement Wing.

During this time of trials and tribulations in forming a recognizable force, the flying echelon had transferred to Davis-Monthan Field, Arizona, on 20 June for incidental training. The flight crews had been chosen and assigned, having completed their respective training schools; i.e., pilot, navigator, bombardier, engineer, radio and gunnery.

Members of the squadron had to complete three phases of training prior to moving overseas and entering combat. The flying personnel spent most of October in transition training with the B-24, training combat crews as well. Meanwhile, the ground echelon was acquiring, organizing and processing personnel and supplies at Wendover Field.

With the training complete and the personnel and supplies processed, the 308th Bomb Group and the 374th BS officially transferred to the Fourteenth Air Force in China early in 1943. The air echelon began flying its 'brand new' B-24D Liberators from Morrison Field, Florida on 15 February 1943. Traveling by way of the South Atlantic Transport Route through Central and South America, the Azores, Central Africa, Arabia and finally India; while the ground echelon traveled by ship across the Pacific Ocean.

The squadron arrived in India and made many trips over the 'Hump', (the mountainous terrain between India and China), to obtain gasoline, bombs, spare parts and other items needed to prepare for and sustain combat operations. The 374th supported Chinese ground forces by attacking airfields, coal yards, docks, oil refineries and fuel dumps in French Indochina. The squadron also mined rivers and ports, bombed maintenance shops and docks at Rangoon in Burma and attacked Japanese shipping in the East China Sea, the Formosa Straits, the South China Sea and the Gulf of Tonkin.

The squadron moved to India in June 1945, ferrying gasoline and supplies from there back into China. The unit sailed for the United States, where it was inactivated on 6 January 1946.

Strategic Air Command
Reactivated in Alaska in 1947 as a Strategic Air Command (SAC) weather reconnaissance squadron, it gathered meteorological information for combat readiness as an integrated part of strategic aerial reconnaissance. Weather recon, though, was a particularly loose term. There was a constant need for meteorological information, but weather flights were also a convenient cover for the more covert missions with RB-29 Superfortress photo-reconnaissance aircraft over the eastern frontier of the Soviet Union. The unit was inactivated in February 1951.

It was reactivated a few months later in October with new B-47E Stratojet swept-wing medium bombers, which were capable of flying at high subsonic speeds and primarily designed for penetrating the airspace of the Soviet Union.

By the late 1950s, the B-47 was considered to be reaching obsolescence, and was being phased out of SAC's strategic arsenal. B-47s began the transition to AMARC (also known as the Boneyard) at Davis-Monthan in July 1959 and the squadron became non-operational. It was inactivated on 25 June 1961.

Intercontinental Ballistic Missile Squadron
The squadron was reactivated and re-designated as a SAC LGM-25C Titan II ICBM Strategic Missile Squadron in 1962. It operated nine Titan II underground silos, construction of which began in 1960; the first (374–9), being operationally ready on 28 Oct 1963. The nine missile silos controlled by the 374th Strategic Missile Squadron remained on alert for over 20 years during the Cold War. The 1980 Damascus Titan missile explosion is a 'Broken Arrow' incident occurred at site 374–7 on 19 September 1980 which killed one airman and injured twenty-one personnel in the immediate vicinity (see below).

In October 1981, President Ronald Reagan announced that as part of the strategic modernization program, the Titan II systems were to be retired by 1 October 1987. Inactivation of the sites began on 17 March 1985 with 374-8 being the first; the last was on 15 Aug 1986 involving 374–1, 374–4 and 374–2. The squadron was inactivated the same day.

After removal from service, the silos had reusable equipment removed by Air Force personnel, and contractors retrieved salvageable metals before destroying the silos with explosives and filling them in. Access to the vacated control centers was blocked off. Missile sites were later sold off to private ownership after demilitarization. Today the remains of the sites are still visible through aerial imagery, in various states of use or dereliction.

Launch Complex 374-7 incident

On 18 September 1980 at Titan II Launch Complex 374–7, a 308th Missile Maintenance Squadron (MMS) airman was adding pressure to the second stage oxidizer tank. During an incorrect application of a 9-pound socket wrench to the pressure cap, the airman accidentally dropped the socket, which fell down the silo, glanced off the thrust mount and punctured the pressurized first stage fuel tank containing aerozine 50.

Aerozine 50 is hypergolic with the Titan II's oxidizer, nitrogen tetroxide; i.e., they spontaneously ignite on contact with each other. Eventually, the crew evacuated the launch control center as military and civilian response teams arrived to tackle the hazardous situation. Early in the morning of 19 September, a two-man investigation team entered the silo. Because their vapor detectors indicated an explosive atmosphere, the two were ordered to evacuate.

At about 0300 hours, a tremendous explosion rocked the area. One possible trigger for the explosion was the collapse of the now-empty first stage fuel tank, allowing the rest of the missile (including the full oxidizer tank of the first stage) to fall and rupture, allowing the oxidizer to contact the fuel already in the silo. The initial explosion catapulted the 740-ton silo door away from the silo and ejected the second stage and warhead. Once clear of the silo, the second stage exploded. The warhead safety devices performed as designed and it did not explode. Twenty-one personnel in the immediate vicinity of the blast were injured. One member of the two-man silo reconnaissance team who had just emerged from the portal sustained fatal injuries.

At daybreak, the Air Force retrieved the warhead and took it to Little Rock AFB. During the recovery, the Missile Wing Commander received strong support from other military units as well as Federal, state, and local officials. Arkansas's governor, Bill Clinton, played an important role in overseeing the proper deployment of state emergency resources.

The wing received some of its greatest accolades in the wake of the disaster. Perhaps realizing the public confidence had suffered a blow, wing personnel made a stronger effort to reach out to local communities. This effort won Air Force recognition in 1983, when the wing became the first missile wing ever to win the General Bruce K. Holloway humanitarian service trophy for the year 1982. The unit also earned the Omaha trophy for 1982, recognizing it as the best in SAC.

Lineage
 Constituted as the 374th Bombardment Squadron (Heavy) on 28 January 1942
 Activated on 15 April 1942.
 Redesignated 374th Bombardment Squadron, Heavy on 20 August 1943
 Inactivated on 6 January 1946
 Redesignated 374th Reconnaissance Squadron (Very Long Range, Weather) on 16 September 1947.
 Activated on 15 October 1947
 Inactivated on 21 February 1951
 Redesignated 374th Bombardment Squadron, Medium on 4 October 1951
 Activated on 10 October 1951.
 Discontinued and inactivated on 25 June 1961
 Redesignated 374th Strategic Missile Squadron (ICBM-Titan) and activated 1 Sep 1962
 Inactivated on 15 Aug 1986

Assignments
 308th Bombardment Group, 15 April 1942 – 6 January 1946
 7th Weather Group (later 2107th Air Weather Group), 15 October 1947 – 21 February 1951
 308th Bombardment Group, 10 October 1951 (attached to 21st Air Division until 17 April 1952)
 308th Bombardment Wing, 16 June 1952 – 25 June 1961 (not operational after 15 July 1959)
 308th Strategic Missile Wing, 1 September 1962 – 15 August 1986

Stations

 Gowen Field, Idaho, 15 April 1942
 Davis-Monthan Field, Arizona, 18 June 1942
 Alamogordo Army Airfield, New Mexico, 24 July 1942
 Davis-Monthan Field, Arizona, 28 August 1942
 Wendover Field, Utah, 1 October 1942
 Pueblo Army Air Base, Colorado, 1 December 1942 – 2 January 1943
 Chengkung Airfield, China, 20 March 1943
 Hsinching Airfield, China, 18 February 1945
 Rupsi Airfield, India, 27 June – 14 October 1945

 Camp Kilmer, New Jersey, 5–6 January 1946
 Ladd Field, Alaska, 15 October 1947
 One flight operated from Fairfield-Suisun Army Air Field, California, and later from Shemya Air Force Base, Alaska Territory, 15 October 1947 – 15 May 1949
 Eielson Air Force Base, Alaska, 6 March 1949 – 21 February 1951
 Forbes Air Force Base, Kansas, 10 October 1951
 Hunter Air Force Base, Georgia, 17 April 1952
 Plattsburgh Air Force Base, New York, 15 July 1959 – 25 June 1961
 Little Rock Air Force Base, Arkansas, 1 Sep 1962 – 15 Aug 1986

Aircraft and missiles 
 Douglas B-18 Bolo, 1942
 Consolidated B-24 Liberator, 1942–1945
 Boeing B-29 Superfortress, 1947–1951, 1951–1952
 Boeing WB-29 Superfortress, 1947–1951
 Boeing RB-29 Superfortress, 1947–1951
 Douglas C-47 Skytrain, 1947–1951
 Boeing B-47 Stratojet, 1953–1959
 LGM-25C Titan II, 1962–1986

The squadron operated nine missile sites:

 374-1 (23 Dec 1963 – 15 Aug 1985), 1.1 mi ENE of Blackwell, Arkansas 
 374-2 (19 Dec 1963 – 15 Aug 1986), 2.0 mi NNE of Plummerville, AR 
 374-3 (19 Dec 1963 – 5 Aug 1986), 3.9 mi ENE of Hattieville, AR 
 374-4 (28 Dec 1963 – 15 Aug 1986), 1.4 mi NNE of Springfield, AR 
 374-5 (26 Dec 1963 – 19 May 1986), 3.3 mi ESE of Wooster, AR 
 374-6 (18 Dec 1963 – 25 Jun 1986), 3.8 mi SW of Guy, AR 
 374-7 (18 Dec 1963 – 21 Sep 1980)*, 3.3 mi NNE of Damascus, AR 
 374-8 (20 Dec 1963 – 17 Mar 1985), 4.3 mi SSW of Quitman, AR 
 374-9 (28 Oct 1963 – 3 Oct 1985), 2.5 mi SSW of Pearson, AR

See also 

 Titan II ICBM Launch Complex 374-5 Site
 List of United States Air Force missile squadrons

References

Notes

Bibliography

 
 
 

 Further reading
 

374
Military units and formations disestablished in 1986